Biren Singh may refer to:
 Nongthombam Biren Singh, Indian politician and footballer
 Kshetrimayum Biren Singh, Indian politician